Paul A. "Dutch" Reule was an American football player.  He played college football for the Mississippi A & M Aggies of Mississippi A & M University, selected an All-Southern fullback in 1912. He played for the Toledo Maroons.

See also
1912 College Football All-Southern Team

References

American football fullbacks
Mississippi State Bulldogs football players
All-Southern college football players
Toledo Maroons players